Sahl Smbatean Eṙanshahik (in Arabic sources: Sahl ibn Sunbat or Sahl ibn Sunbat al-Armaniyy; birthdate unknown – c. 855) was an Armenian prince of Arran and Shaki who played a considerable role in the history of the eastern Caucasus during the 9th century and was the ancestor of the House of Khachen established in 821.

Name
Armenian Smbatean or Arabic ibn Sunbat was Sahl's paternal name – Smbat is derived from the Pahlavi proper name Sunbādh "Sinbad".  "Mask" is the Arabic form of his name, Sahak.

Origins
Movses Kaghankatvatsi wrote that Sahl Smbatyan was a descendant of the ancient Armenian House of Aranshahik (itself a branch of the Syunid dynasty). This dynasty had a blood feud with the Mihranid dynasty,. According to tradition, in the beginning of the 7th century the Mihranids had invited 60 men of the Aranshahiks to a banquet and had killed them all, with the exception of Zarmihr Aranshahik, who had married a Mihranid princess. Hence the Mihranid family had become princes of Gardman and presiding princes of all Caucasian Albania. Sahl Smbatean was a descendant of Zarmihr Aranshahik.

Hence the House of Khachen is regarded as a cadet branch of the House of Aranshahik. Although some historians make a difference between Sahl of Shaki and Sahak of Syunik. According to the historian Robert H. Hewsen, Sahl was a Syunid prince, who seized Gegharkunik from Syunid family domains and established a princedom for himself.

When Sahl came to power, the Mihranid family's power was already weakening. In 822 the last heir of this family, princess Spram Mihranian, married Sahl's son Atrnerseh I in the fortress of Khachen. Subsequently, the new princedom expanded to the east and included Artsakh and Gardman.

Reign
In Armenian sources, Sahl Smbatean and his brothers are remembered for their successful battles against enemy invaders in the mountains of Artsakh. The earliest known clash between Sahl and the Arab army took place in 822, when the latter invaded the canton of Amaras. The Arab rule in the region was substantially weakened due to the revolt of Babak Khorramdin in Iranian Azerbaijan (822-837). Babak married the daughter of Vasak, Prince of Syunik, and fought with him against the Islamic conquest of Persia. However, after the death of Vasak (in 822), Babak tried to dominate Syunik and Artsakh, and in 826-831 committed atrocities against the revolted Armenians of Balk, Gegharkunik and Lachin (the three cantons of Syunik). In that account, Babak was described as "the murderous, world-ravaging, bloodthirsty beast" by the Armenian historiographer Movses Kaghankatvatsi. The Armenians continued the struggle against Babak in the cantons of Artsakh.

In 837-838 Afshin, the prominent general of the Abbasid Caliph Al-Mutasim, was sent to Armenia to fight against Babak. After a crushing defeat, Babak took refuge in the mountains controlled by Sahl Smbatean, who, however, captured him and surrendered to Afshin. Sahl received 1,000,000 silver dirham's in reward from Afshin. According to Movses Kaghankatvatsi, the Caliphate assigned him sovereignty over Armenia, Georgia and Albania.

Exile
In 854, according to Tovma Artsruni, Sahl Smbatean and many other princes of Armenia (including Atrnerseh of Khachen and Esayi Abu-Muse of Ktish)  were captured by Bugha al-Kabir, the Turkish commander of the Abbasid Caliph Al-Mutawakkil, and exiled to Samarra. Atrnerseh would soon return to Sodk; the fate of Sahl Smbatean is unknown, although he died sometime after 855.

See also
 Esayi Abu-Muse

References

House of Aranshahik
9th-century Armenian people
Monarchs of Hereti